Eupogoniopsis is a genus of longhorn beetles of the subfamily Lamiinae, containing the following species:

 Eupogoniopsis caudatula Holzschuh, 1999
 Eupogoniopsis omeimontis (Gressitt, 1938)
 Eupogoniopsis sepicola Holzschuh, 1999
 Eupogoniopsis tenuicornis (Bates, 1884)

References

Desmiphorini